The Musée de la Magie, also known as the Musée de la Curiosité et de la Magie and the Académie de la Magie, is a private museum located in the 4th arrondissement at 11, rue saint Paul, Paris, France. It is open several afternoons per week; an admission fee is charged.

The museum occupies 16th-century cellars beneath the Marquis de Sade's house, and includes items relating to magic shows, including optical illusions, secret boxes, wind-up toys, magic mirrors, see-through glasses, posters, etc. It also provides magic shows. The museum is collocated with the Musée des Automates, which contains more than 100 historical and contemporary automata.

"The Museum of Magic is at 11 Rue Saint Paul in the 4th arrondissement. Nearest metro: St. Paul or Sully Morland."

See also 
 American Museum of Magic
 List of museums in Paris
 List of magic museums

References

External Links 
 Musée de la Magie
 Musée des Automates
 Paris.org entry
 Museums of Paris entry
 Evene.fr entry (French)
 Lonely Planet description

Magic museums
Museums in Paris
Buildings and structures in the 4th arrondissement of Paris